Keith Harris (born ) was an English cricketer. He was a left-handed batsman who played for Cheshire. He was born in St Helens.

Harris played in the Minor Counties Championship between 1981 and 1983, and made a single List A appearance for the side, during the 1982 season, against Middlesex. From the lower-middle order, he scored 17 runs.

External links
Keith Harris at Cricket Archive

1957 births
Living people
Cheshire cricketers
Cricketers from St Helens, Merseyside
English cricketers